C-Real or C:Real or C Real may refer to:
C-Real (rapper), Ghanaian rapper
C:Real (Greek band)
C-REAL, a South Korean band

See also
 Cereal (disambiguation)
 Serial (disambiguation)